Jacobowitz is a Yiddish-language variant of the East Slavic surname Yakubovich. It is a patronymic surname literally meaning "son of Jacob" in Slavic. Notable people with the surname include:

Alex Jacobowitz
 Eden Jacobowitz

See also

Yiddish-language surnames
Patronymic surnames